Drug Church is an American post-hardcore band from Albany, New York, United States. The band has released four albums, as well as several EPs.

History
Drug Church started as a side project for singer Patrick Kindlon of Self Defense Family. After having released a three-song demo online in 2011, the band got signed by No Sleep Records by the beginning of 2012. Drug Church then signed to Pure Noise Records in 2018 who released their album, "Cheer". The band's fourth album "Hygiene" was announced on November 10, 2021 with the release of the singles "Miles of Fun" and "Detective Lieutenant", and was released on March 11, 2022 through Pure Noise Records. On March 1, 2023, the band released the single Myopic through Pure Noise Records.

Lyrical and musical style
Musically the band mixes hardcore punk in the style of bands like Black Flag with alternative rock and grunge elements to create their post-punk/post-hardcore sound.
The lyrics to their songs focus mostly on social matters and tend to be dark and/or satirical. In a Q&A Session on the website of his other project Self Defense Family, Kindlon has stated that he has no pre-written lyrics for his bands and rather writes the songs' lyrics while in the studio:

Completely different people write the instrument portion of the music. Leads to a very different feel, so, very different lyrics.
Also, I write everything in the studio. So, there’s no bank of lyrics I pull from. This is made to order, not buffet.

Members

Current members 
 Nick Cogan – guitar (2011-present)
 Cory Galusha – guitar (2011-present)
 Patrick Kindlon – vocals (2011-present)
 Chris Villeneuve – drums (2011-present)
 Patrick Wynne – bass (2011-present)

Discography

Studio albums

EPs and other

References

Hardcore punk groups from New York (state)
Musical groups from Albany, New York
No Sleep Records artists
Pure Noise Records artists